Man in the Shadow is a 1957 American CinemaScope crime Western film directed by Jack Arnold and starring Jeff Chandler, Orson Welles, Colleen Miller and Ben Alexander.

Plot
The cow town of Spurline is effectively ruled by Virgil Renchler, owner of the Golden Empire ranch.

One night, some of Renchler's hands beat young laborer Juan Martín to death. The newly elected sheriff of Spurline, Ben Sadler, decides to investigate the murder, but must contend with Renchler's henchmen and the fierce opposition of the townspeople, who fear that Spurline would be ruined without the Golden Empire's business.

Ranch foreman Ed Yates admits to Renchler that he killed Martin, but employee Chet Huneker is persuaded to tell the law that he had hit Martin accidentally with a car. Renchler's daughter Skippy tells the sheriff what she remembers from the night of Martin's death.

Sadler is beaten by Yates and Huneker, then dragged through town, tied to the back of a truck. Sadler retrieves a shotgun, tosses aside his badge and, with help from cropper Aiken Clay, pursues Renchler and his men, defeating them with the help of the townspeople, who then return Sadler's badge to him.

Cast

Jeff Chandler as Ben Sadler
Orson Welles as Virgil Renchler
Colleen Miller as Skippy Renchler
Ben Alexander as Ab Begley
Barbara Lawrence as Helen Slader
John Larch as Ed Yates
James Gleason as Hank James
Royal Dano as Aiken Clay
Paul Fix as Herb Parker
Leo Gordon as Chet Huneker
Martin Garralaga as Jesus Cisneros
Mario Siletti as Tony Santoro, the barber
Charles Horvath as Len Bookman
William Schallert as Jim Shaney
Joseph J. Greene as Harry Youngquist
Forrest Lewis as Jake Kelley, the Coroner
Harry Harvey Sr. as Dr. Creighton
Joe Schneider as Juan Martin
Mort Mills as Empire Ranch Gateman Bill Edmunds

Production
The film was originally titled Pay the Devil. It was Jeff Chandler's last film under his exclusive deal with Universal.

Albert Zugsmith claimed that the film's budget was $600,000, much of which was overhead.

The part of Virgil Renchler was originally to be played by Robert Middleton, but agents from the William Morris Agency suggested Orson Welles, who badly needed the money ($60,000) to pay back taxes. It was Welles' first Western role. While making the film, Welles rewrote sections of the script. He also formed a relationship with Zugsmith, who produced Welles' next film as director, Touch of Evil (1958). Director Jack Arnold said that he experienced one incident with Welles on Welles' first day of shooting, but after that, Welles was "wonderful" to work with and offered many good ideas.

Filming began in October 1956.

See also
 List of American films of 1958

References

External links
 
 
 

1957 films
1957 crime films
American detective films
Films directed by Jack Arnold
Universal Pictures films
American black-and-white films
1950s English-language films
1950s American films